Panbang is a settlement in the south of Bhutan. It is located in Zhemgang District, close to the border with India.

Panbang is a small town in Bhutan under Zhemgang Dzongkhag (District). It is located 13 kilometers from the Indian border. There is no road that connects Panbang to other parts of Bhutan except the rough road that leads to Royal Manas National Park. In order to travel to bordering places like Gelephu, Phuentsholing, Samdrup Jongkhar and Nganglam they have to use the road via India where people often get stranded on the way due to unexpected strike, thus, posing risk to the travelers. However, with the ongoing construction of Gomphu-Panbang High Way, people of Panbang are expecting to have better and safer transportation. 
Panbang serves as a main shopping area to the people of four gewogs (blocks) under Panbang Dungkhag (Sub-divisional Officer).
Nowadays Panbang is equipped with the modern amenities. With the increasing number of school dropped outs, Panbang is seeing young and hardworking entrepreneurs coming out with various ideas like organic farming, rafting company, chicken farming, piggery, fishery etc. 
First school was established in 1979 as Primary school and now upgraded to Lower Secondary school. In the year 2009 Middle Secondary was established in Thinleygang (about 3 kilometers from Panbang).
Panbang has quite a good health facilities (1 BHU Grade I hospital) and only in the year 2009, mobile service became functional in the area though people were using telephone facilities.
Winter is the best time to visit Panbang, during which it becomes very busy due to the orange auction season.

For Political election 2013, Candidates from Panbang are from various professionals. Former Labour and Human Minister, Dorji Wangdi is representing Druk Phuentsum Tshogpa. Senior Teacher of Zhemgang High School, Rinchen Tshering is representing Druk Nyamrup Tshopa. And aspiring candidate for Druk Mangsui Tshopa is Sangay Dorji, the former candidate who contested the last NA election in 2008. Panbang has also youngest candidates known for his strength and represent youth from the Druk Chirwang Tshogpa, Tenzin Jamtsho- fresh graduate.

In the recent primary round of election DPT's Dorji Wangdi secured 1580 votes. PDP Sangay Dorji secured 839 votes, followed by Rinchen Tshering securing 605 votes, the candidate of DNT. DCT secured 136 votes.

References
Armington, S. (2002) Bhutan. (2nd ed.) Melbourne: Lonely Planet.

Populated places in Bhutan